Erdling (German for "Earthling") are a German rock band founded in 2014 by Neill Freiwald and Niklas Kahl.

History 
After guitarist Neill Freiwald left the band Stahlmann and the side project Sündenklang at the end of 2014, ostensibly due to time constraints, drummer Niklas Kahl followed in spring 2015, who, according to his own statement, “couldn't increasingly identify with the band”.

Together with guitarist Neno and bassist Marco, the first recordings began in the studio of Chris Harms. After Erdling was signed "surprisingly quickly" by Out of Line, according to Neill, they released their first maxi single Blitz und Donner in October 2015, followed by tours with Unzucht and Megaherz.

In January 2016 Erdling released their debut album Aus den Tiefen, in August of the same year they played for the first time at the M’era Luna Festival in 
Hildesheim. At this gig, the band played for the first time without their bass player Marco Politi, a few days later the band announced that Marco had announced his departure shortly before the festival and had not come to rehearsals, so they had decided on a replacement. On November 8, Erdling introduced Nate Pearson as the new bassist. Her second album Supernova was released on March 17, 2017. In January 2018, Niklas Kahl, who had switched to Lord of the Lost, was replaced by Christian Eichlinger. In February 2018, Pierre Anders replaced the previous bassist Nate Pearson. At the same time, the band announced their third album, Dämon, which was released in July 2018. On March 22, 2019, Erdling released the single Wir sind Midgard and announced that the fourth album planned for 2020 would be “different, faster, more Metal-heavy, but also deeper”. At the same time, the tour dates for the band's second headline tour were announced. In a video blog of his own, Freiwald stated that work on the new album had already started simultaneously with the production of the previous one. He also justified the departure of the bassist Anders for professional reasons. Freiwald will take over the bass himself in the future, so that Erdling will appear as a trio. On July 5, 2019, the second single In Namen der Krähe was released, in which singer Robert Dahn (Equilibrium, Minas Morgul) participated. A short time later, Robin Sem Vedrfölnir was hired as the new bass player. The third single Wölfe der Nacht was released in November 2019, where Chris Pohl (Blutengel) can be heard as a guest singer. Their fourth album Yggdrasil followed on January 10, 2020.

Members 
Current members
 Neill Freiwald (Neill Devin) - lead vocals, guitar, programming (2014–present), bass (2019)
 Valeria "Valy" Ereth (BÖSE FUCHS) - guitar (2021–present)
 Max Nash - guitar (2021-present)
 Christian Schäfer - drums (2021–present)
 Robin "Rob" Sem Vedrfölnir - bass (2019–present)

Former members
 Marco Politi - bass (2014–2016)
 Niklas Kahl - drums (2014–2018)
 Nate Pearson - bass (2016–2018)
 Pierre Anders - bass (2018–2019)
 Christian Eichlinger - drums (2018–2021)
 Neno Knuckle (Ne Djentno) - guitar (2014-2021)

Discography

Albums
 2016: Aus den Tiefen
 2017: Supernova
 2018: Dämon
 2020: Yggdrasil
 2021: Helheim
 2023: Bestia

Singles 
 2015: Blitz und Donner
 2016: Mein Element
 2018: Tieftaucher
 2019: Wir sind Midgard
 2019: Im Namen der Krähe
 2019: Wölfe der Nacht
 2019: Am heiligen Hain
 2021: Fimbulwinter
 2021: Rabenherz
 2021: Götterdämmerung
 2022: DEUS

EPs 
 2018: Dämon - The Secret Tracks

Music videos 
 2015: Blitz und Donner
 2016: Mein Element
 2017: Absolutus Rex
 2018: Tieftaucher
 2018: Wieso Weshalb Warum
 2018: Nichts als Staub
 2019: Wir sind Midgard
 2019: Im Namen der Krähe
 2019: Wölfe der Nacht
 2019: Am heiligen Hain
 2020: Blizzard
 2021: Fimbulwinter
 2021: Rabenherz
 2021: Götterdämmerung
 2021: Der Mensch verdient die Erde nicht
 2022: Deus

External links 

 Official Website

German Neue Deutsche Härte music groups
German rock music groups
German industrial metal musical groups
German gothic metal musical groups
Musical groups established in 2014